Khaled Al Haj Othman (born 1 May 1987 in Aleppo, Syria) is a Syrian football goalkeeper .

Honour and Titles

Club
Al-Ittihad
Syrian Cup: 2011
AFC Cup: 2010

References

1987 births
Living people
Sportspeople from Aleppo
Association football goalkeepers
Syrian footballers
Syria international footballers
Al-Ittihad Aleppo players
Expatriate footballers in Saudi Arabia
Syrian expatriate sportspeople in Saudi Arabia
Syrian expatriate footballers
Damac FC players
Qilwah FC players
Saudi First Division League players
Saudi Second Division players
AFC Cup winning players
Syrian Premier League players